The following is a list of prisons in Sierra Leone according to the Sierra Leone Encyclopedia:

The Prison headquarters is in Freetown. The Prison Officers Training School is in Waterloo.

 Freetown Central Prison, Freetown, Western Region
 Waterloo Oil Palm Plantation, Waterloo, Western Region
 Masanki Prison, Masanki, Southern Region
 Moyamba Prison, Moyamba, Southern Region
 Bo Prison, Bo, Southern Region
 Bonthe Prison, Bonthe, Southern Region
 Pujehun Prison, Pujehun, Southern Region
 Makeni Prison, Makeni, Northern Region
 Port Loko Prison, Port Loko, Northern Region
 Kambia Prison, Kambia, Northern Region
 Kabala Prison, Kabala, Northern Region
 Magburaka Prison, Magburaka, Northern Region
 Mafanta Prison, Magburaka, Northern Region
 Kenema Prison, Kenema, Eastern Region
 Kono Prison, Sefadu, Eastern Region
 Kailahun Prison, Kailahun, Eastern Region

 
Sierra Leone
Prisons